Kunnes joet muuttaa suuntaa (in English: Until Rivers Change Direction) is the sixth studio album by Finnish pop rock singer-songwriter Maija Vilkkumaa, released by Warner Music Finland and WEA in Finland on April 19, 2010. Debuting at number-one upon release on the Finnish Albums Chart and spending there 27 weeks in three runs up to 2011, the album has sold 16,000 copies to date, which has granted it a gold certification in Finland.

Singles
During 2010, three singles were released from Kunnes joet muuttaa suuntaa, "Lottovoitto" on March 1, "Dingo ja Yö" on July 18 and "Kuuraiset puut" on November 29.

Track listing
The (rough) English translations of the tracks are in the brackets.

Charts and certifications

Weekly charts

Year-end charts

Certifications

References

2010 albums
Maija Vilkkumaa albums
Finnish-language albums